Lafayette Avenue Presbyterian Church is a historic Presbyterian church complex located at 875 Elmwood Ave, Buffalo in Erie County, New York. The complex consists of the large cruciform-plan church building that was built in 1894 with an attached rear chapel. Adjoining them is the Community House that constructed of brick in the Tudor Revival style, that was built in 1921. The main church building is constructed of Medina sandstone with a terra cotta tile roof in the Romanesque Revival style. The church cost $150,000 to build and has a capacity of 1,000 people

History
The current church was the parish's third, and was built in response to demand for a larger place of worship. The parish originally worshiped in a building located at Lafayette Square.

The Lafayette Avenue Presbyterian Church was listed on the National Register of Historic Places in 2009.  It is located in the Elmwood Historic District–East.

References
Notes

External links
Official website

Churches on the National Register of Historic Places in New York (state)
Churches completed in 1894
19th-century Presbyterian church buildings in the United States
Romanesque Revival church buildings in New York (state)
Presbyterian churches in New York (state)
Churches in Buffalo, New York
National Register of Historic Places in Buffalo, New York
Historic district contributing properties in Erie County, New York